Periya Manushan is a 1997 Tamil-language comedy film directed by Guru Dhanapal. The film stars Sathyaraj and Ravali . It was released on 30 October 1997 as one among Deepavali releases.

Plot 

Ramakrishnan (Sathyaraj) has two wives. Sivagami (Ambika), his first wife, is sterile while Parvathi (Kovai Sarala), his second wife, has a daughter, Indhu (Ravali). Indhu falls in love with, Ramakrishnan's nephew, Subramani (Sathyaraj).

Cast 

Sathyaraj as Ramakrishnan / Subramani
Ravali as Indhu
Manivannan as Johnson
Ambika as Sivagami
Kovai Sarala as Parvathi
Vadivelu as Chellappa
Nizhalgal Ravi as Indhu's cousin
Vinu Chakravarthy as Indhu's uncle
Vennira Aadai Moorthy
Arivoli
 Alphonsa
Sharmili
Halwa Vasu
Thalapathi Dinesh as Marimuthu
Mayilsamy
S. P. Balasubrahmanyam as a doctor

Production 
Ravali replaced Shruti in the lead role of the film.

Soundtrack 

The film score and the soundtrack were composed by Deva. The soundtrack, released in 1997, features 5 tracks with lyrics written by Vaali, Kalidasan and Pazhani Bharathi.

Release and Reception 
Periya Manushan was released on 30 October 1997 on the eve of Diwali. The film did not perform well at the box office.

References 

1990s Tamil-language films
1997 films
Films directed by Guru Dhanapal
Indian comedy films
Films scored by Deva (composer)